Sejong Sportstoto Women's Football Club (Korean: 세종 스포츠토토 여자 축구단) is a South Korean women's football team based in Sejong. The club competes in the WK League, the top division of women's football in South Korea, and plays its home games at Sejong Central Park.

History
The club was founded as Chungbuk Sportsoto on 16 March 2011, but moved to Daejeon ahead of the 2014 season, changing its name to Daejeon Sportstoto. The club relocated to Gumi, North Gyeongsang on 29 January 2016, changing its name to Gumi Sportstoto. On 20 December 2019, the club moved again, this time to Sejong, becoming Sejong Sportstoto.

Current squad

Backroom staff

Coaching staff
Manager:  Yoon Deok-yeo
Coach:  Kang Min-jung
Coach:  An Jung-hyuk
Coach:  Kim Byeong-gon

Support staff
Club doctor:  Lee Eun-mi

Source: Official website

Season-by-season records

References

External links 
Official website 

Women's football clubs in South Korea
Association football clubs established in 2011
WK League clubs
2011 establishments in South Korea